Elaiza is a German band from Berlin that represented Germany in the Eurovision Song Contest 2014 in Copenhagen, Denmark, with their song "Is It Right". The leader of the group is Elżbieta "Ela" Steinmetz. She was born in Ukraine and is of mixed Polish and Ukrainian origin as her mother comes from Poland and her father is from Ukraine.
 This cultural background is reflected in the sound of her songs.

Career

Early beginnings
At the age of 16 Steinmetz began to work as a singer-songwriter at Valicon-Studios, Berlin. At the recording studio she met accordionist Yvonne Grünwald. At some event Grünwald saw a photo of Natalie Plöger with her string bass, and Plöger was invited to play with them.

2013: Formation
Early in 2013 the three women founded the band Elaiza. At Emil Berliner Studios Elaiza produced in March 2013 the LP "March 28" via direct-to-disk recording. The record was named after the date of recording and was published by the label Berliner Meister Schallplatten. Since then the band applied itself to the production of its debut album, which is in progress in collaboration with the Valicon-producer team at Berlin. In 2013 the band won the newcomer award at the famous Women-of-the-World-Festival. In January 2014 Elaiza released an EP with the songs Is It Right, Fight Against Myself and Without.

2014–present: Eurovision Song Contest and Gallery

With their song Is It Right written together with Mesanic Music headwriter Adam Kesselhaut, Elaiza applied via YouTube for the so-called wild card for the German preselection, where the broadcaster had seeded seven acts. Elaiza were chosen to perform among the ten best entries at a club concert at Edelfettwerk, Hamburg. The trio won the televoting, which qualified them to start at the German preselection Unser Song für Dänemark on 13 March 2014 at Lanxess-Arena, Cologne, with seven other contenders. In the third and final round Elaiza won the televoting with 55 percent against the band Unheilig, which is very popular in Germany. On 28 March 2014 they released their debut studio album Gallery, it peaked at number 24 in Germany. Elaiza represented Germany at the Eurovision Song Contest on 10 May 2014 at Copenhagen.

Members
 Elżbieta "Ela" Steinmetz (born 11 October 1992 in Smila, Ukraine) — vocals, piano
 Laura Zimmermann (born 8 April 1989 in Munich, Bavaria, West Germany – accordion, violin, backing vocals
 Natalie Plöger (born 3 September 1985 in Leer, Lower Saxony, West Germany) — string bass, backings
 Yvonne Grünwald (born 10 May 1984 in Salzwedel, Saxony-Anhalt, East Germany)  — accordion, Glockenspiel, backing vocals. Grünwald left the band in August 2016 to pursue other music projects.

Discography

Albums

Singles

Other charted songs

References

Eurovision Song Contest entrants for Germany
Eurovision Song Contest entrants of 2014
German musical trios
All-female bands
Articles containing video clips
Musical groups from Berlin